The National Jazz Museum in Harlem is a museum dedicated to preservation and celebration of the jazz history of Harlem, Manhattan, New York City. The idea for the museum was conceived in 1995. The museum was founded in 1997 by Leonard Garment, counsel to two U.S. presidents, and an accomplished jazz saxophonist, Abraham David Sofaer, a former U.S. district judge who gave the initial gift in honor of his brother-in-law Richard J. Scheuer, Jr., and matching funds from the Upper Manhattan Empowerment Zone Development Corporation. For more than 15 years, the museum was based in East Harlem at 104 East 126th Street.

On February 1, 2016, the museum re-opened in a new space on the ground floor of 58 West 129th Street in Central Harlem with approximately 1900 square feet of exhibition space.

Programs and exhibits
The National Jazz Museum in Harlem's Visitors Center has featured exhibits such as The Ghosts of Harlem by American music producer, photographer, and author Hank O'Neal. The show included images of Harlem jazz legends that O'Neal had the chance to interview and photograph for his book of the same name. The Visitors Center also houses books, recordings, and documentaries for guests to enjoy as well as photographs of contemporary jazz musicians.

The museum hosts weekly programs such as the Harlem Speaks lecture series and Jazz for Curious Listeners sessions in which jazz novices and experts alike listen and learn about rare jazz recordings. The museum hosts events and programs at jazz venues and other museums such as the Rubin Museum of Art for the Harlem in the Himalayas concert series.

Jonathan Batiste has been working with the museum since 2008 when he helped create the program Jazz Is: Now! in which his Stay Human band plays and "he deconstructs jazz, walking people through the theory and history of the music, often with the help of guests." Batiste was named associate artistic director of the museum in 2012.

The Savory Collection
In August 2010 The National Jazz Museum in Harlem acquired nearly 1,000 discs of recorded radio broadcasts made by audio engineer William Savory in the midst of the swing era in the 1930s. The collection includes performances by best selling jazz artists Louis Armstrong, Billie Holiday, and Benny Goodman. Savory had access to bigger, slower-playing aluminum and acetate records and he was able to record much longer clips, capturing extended live shows and jam sessions that many thought would be lost forever. The recordings are being digitized by Brooklyn-based recording engineer Doug Pomeroy, a specialist in audio restoration. The transformation involves cleaning, correcting pitch, removing extraneous noise, mixing and mastering. The Savory Collection is being made available for purchase and portions of this collection have been made available for digital download through iTunes, as of May 2017 three volumes are available. Mosaic Records also released a limited-edition 6-CD set with selections from the collection.

Board of Directors 

 
 Jonathan Scheuer, Chairman
 Abraham D. Sofaer, Vice Chairman
 Daryl Libow, Secretary
 Mark A. Willis, Treasurer
 Ken Burns
 Neal Dittersdorf 
 Gregory Floyd
 Alan S. Kaplinsky
 Wynton Marsalis
 Kenneth McIntyre
 Robert R. Nelson, Jr.
 Timothy L. Porter
 Lisa Staiano-Coico (aka Lisa S. Coico)
 Richard S. Taffett
 Lloyd Williams
 Leonard Garment, Founding Board Member (In Memoriam)
 Dr. Billy Taylor (In Memoriam)

References

See also
 List of music museums

Jazz culture
Jazz organizations
Museums established in 1995
Museums in Manhattan
Music museums in New York (state)
Harlem
Jazz in New York City